Abhay Bang and Rani Bang are Indian activists and community health researchers working in the Gadchiroli district of Maharashtra, India. Together, they have overseen a programme that has substantially reduced infant mortality rates, one which has been endorsed by the World Health Organization (WHO) and UNICEF and is now being rolled out across India and in parts of Africa. Abhay and Rani Bang also founded the non-profit Society For Education, Action and Research in Community Health (SEARCH), which is involved in rural health service and research.

They won the Maharashtra Bhushan Award, and have been awarded honorary doctorates from the Sanjay Gandhi Postgraduate Institute of Medical Sciences at Lucknow. SNDT Women's University, Mumbai has also awarded honoris causa to Rani Bang. The Lancet described the couple as "the pioneers of health care in rural India". Abhay and Rani Bang were the first recipients of the Distinguished Alumni Award from the Department of International Health at the Johns Hopkins Bloomberg School of Public Health. They were also inducted into the Johns Hopkins Society of Scholars, for their leadership in community-based health care that is helping to save the lives of millions of newborns and children. During their careers, the Bangs have helped foster a renaissance in community-based primary health care. In 2016, Johns Hopkins University conferred the Distinguished Alumni Award upon them.

Early life

Abhay Bang 
Abhay Bang was born in Wardha, Maharashtra, India, in 1950 to Thakurdas Bang and Suman Bang. His parents were followers of the Sarvodaya movement, inspired by the thought of Mahatma Gandhi. His father, a young economist, went to Gandhi to seek his blessings when he was about to go to the United States for his doctoral studies. Gandhi said that if he wanted to study economics, he should instead go to the villages of India. Thakurdas then cancelled his trip, remaining in India to study the economics of Indian villages.

Abhay spent his childhood in Gandhi's Sevagram Ashram at Wardha, with Gandhi's foremost disciple Acharya Vinoba Bhave. Until ninth standard, he studied in a school which followed the tenets of Nai Taleem, a method of practical hands-on education propagated by Gandhi himself.

When Abhay was 13 years old, he decided, after discussing this with his older brother Ashok, that he would work for villagers' health.

Rani Bang 
Rani Chari was born in Chandrapur. She came from a family with roots in medical and public service.

Education 
Abhay and Rani completed their graduation and post graduation in medical studies from Nagpur University, and married in 1977. They both studied Masters in Public Health at Johns Hopkins University.

Abhay and Rani Bang completed their MBBS from the Government Medical College in Nagpur, Maharashtra in 1972. Abhay Bang was first in the university in MBBS and had three gold medals. He did his MD (with a first position in the university) while Rani did her MD in obstetrics and gynaecology (with a first position in the university and gold medal). They helped organise and lead a national group of medical professionals concerned with health-care quality and delivery. After their medical studies, the couple moved to Wardha and co-founded Chetna Vikas, a non-profit organization. While working in villages of Wardha district, Abhay Bang published a study challenging the minimum wages fixed for agriculture labour in Maharashtra, which were subsequently raised by the government. They both then completed Masters in Public Health from Johns Hopkins University, Baltimore, United States, in 1984. Following Gandhian principles, the couple returned to India following their masters to work with the poor.

Work 
After returning to India they started working in Gadchiroli. They founded SEARCH in December 1985 and started working on community health problems in the tribal and rural areas of Gadchiroli. SEARCH established a partnership with communities in Gadchiroli for health and development and helped create "tribal-friendly" clinics and a hospital in the district.

Reduction in infant mortality rate
When the couple started holding people health assemblies they found that addressing infant mortality was a pressing need. The death of a one-month-old child within minutes of being brought to them greatly impacted the couple. They found 18 possible causes of such an infant's death, including poverty, diarrhoea, infection, pneumonia, or lack of a hospital. The Bangs and their colleagues at SEARCH conducted world-class research on practical approaches to reduce mortality of young children in resource-constrained settings. Bang's solution was to train the village women in neonatal care. He wrote a draft of the action research to be conducted and sought comments from his mentor, Carl E. Taylor, the founder of the Department of International Health at Johns Hopkins University. In a handwritten note on the draft, Taylor wrote "Abhay, this will be the most important work that you will ever do in your life". Subsequent work by Abhay Bang and his colleagues in two of the most notable of their studies demonstrated the feasibility and effectiveness of community-based management of childhood pneumonia and the provision of home-based neonatal care by community health workers.

The Home Based Neonatal Care (HBNC) model developed by Bang has resulted in reduction in infant mortality in the study villages of Gadchiroli. The home-based neonatal care interventions developed at SEARCH ignited worldwide interest and research on preventing neonatal deaths in high-mortality, resource-constrained settings. Prior to that, such deaths were considered nearly impossible to avoid. As a result of their work, home-based neonatal care and community-based management of childhood pneumonia are now being implemented throughout the world in these settings. Although initially the medical fraternity objected to Bang's unconventional methods, they gradually understood his wisdom to provide an alternative to a large village community. Later, Indian paediatricians, after studying the evidence from the field, wholeheartedly backed Bang's initiative to save newborns. Today, based on Bang's Gadchiroli model, 800,000 village women in India are now being trained by the government under the ASHA programme. A report from the Harvard University South Asia Institute states that "SEARCH is world renowned for its pioneering work in home-based neonatal care", "the landmark paper, published in The Lancet, changed the medical community's perception of community health workers and the power of home based care for neonates forever" and "the success of the HBNC program spawned the creation of over 800,000 "ASHA" workers through India's National Rural Health Mission."

India has incorporated this model in 12th national five-year plan to reduce infant mortality. This field trial showed that newborn care can be brought out of the confines of big hospitals and high tech units and be so simplified that it can be provided in any village in any home. After this research the global newborn care has never been the same. This approach, which brought down the infant mortality rate in rural Gadchiroli from 121 per 1000 live births to 30, was honoured by The Lancet in 2005 as one of the Vintage Papers. The editor and the historian of the journal considered Bang's paper on newborn care to be one of the milestone ones published in 180 years. This approach was incorporated in the national program by the Government of India and was accepted by the WHO, UNICEF and USAID for reducing newborn mortality in developing countries.

In May 2017, the High Court of Bombay invited Abhay Bang to provide suggestions about how to reduce child mortality and malnutrition in the state of Maharashtra. The High Court accepted the suggestions made by Abhay Bang and directed the state government to incorporate the recommendations in its policy decisions and take appropriate actions.

Liquor ban in Gadchiroli district 
Abhay and Rani Bang were the driving force for the ban in Gadchiroli district. Gadchiroli is the first district in Maharashtra where liquor is banned due to demand by the public. In 1990, the couple raised a movement for liquor ban in Gadchiroli district. Bang made the people of Gadchiroli aware about ill effects of alcohol, which led to demand from people to ban alcohol in Gadchiroli. The movement resulted in liquor ban in the district in 1992, being the first example in India of liquor ban due to public demand.

In May 2012, Abhay Bang was a member of a panel to study a possible liquor ban in Chandrapur district. He advocates the need for an alcohol- and tobacco-free society since, per the Global Burden of Diseases 2015, alcohol and tobacco are two of the top ten causes of death and disease in India. Abhay Bang is developing a multi-pronged approach named "Muktipath" in the district of Gadchiroli to reduce the prevalence of alcohol and tobacco consumption there. He also welcomed the Supreme Court of India's ban on liquor shops on state and national highways.

Women's issues 
Rani Bang has worked extensively on women's medical issues. The community based study of gynaecological problems in rural area that she conducted in 1988 is the first study in the world focusing on women's health beyond maternity care. Rani Bang first brought to the notice of the world that rural women had a large hidden burden of gynaecological diseases. She subsequently trained the Dais in villages to make them village level health workers. With convincing evidence she advocated the need for a comprehensive reproductive health care package for rural women in India. This study initiated the programme of women's reproductive health all over the world specifically in developing countries.

She has written a book, Putting Woman First, which throws light on women's issues in rural India. Their research showed that nearly 92 percent of women had some kind of gynaecological issues. Her research in this field has changed the understanding of this issue worldwide and global policy has changed accordingly.

Rani Bang was one of the principal speakers in Tietze symposium in Rio de Janeiro, Brazil in 1990. She served as a consultant to INCLEN (International Clinical Epidemiology Network) for Reproductive health, IWHAM (International Women's Health Advocates on Microbicides), 10th Five Year Plan Maharashtra Health and Nutrition Committee Member. She was nominated for the Nobel Peace Prize in 2003 as a member of 1000 women worldwide for peace prize.

Rani Bang has worked on women's reproductive health issues, sexually transmitted diseases, AIDS control, adolescent sexual health, tribal health, and alcoholism. She conducts sex education sessions called 'Tarunyabhaan' for adolescents and teenagers across Maharashtra.

In 2008, Rani Bang was awarded the National Award for Women's Development through Application of Science & Technology in recognition of her outstanding and pioneering contribution for the past two and a half decades on improving women's health in rural India through an innovative and powerful approach of research with the people and for the people. The award was conferred upon her by the President of India at the National Conference on Showcasing Cutting Edge Science & Technology by Women in New Delhi.

Tribal health 
Abhay and Rani Bang have been working with the tribal communities in the forest area of Gadchiroli district in Maharashtra since 1986. They found malaria to pose the biggest health concern for this population. They sought to make the local Adivasis aware about the importance of using insecticide-treated mosquito nets in addition to regular medical treatment. They also run a mobile medical unit in the forty eight tribal villages in the Dhanora block of Gadchiroli district and have a network of village volunteers trained in providing primary care in these villages. In July 2017, the Government of Maharashtra formed a task force to control the spread of malaria in the district of Gadchiroli. Abhay Bang was appointed as the head of this task force which comprises the nonprofit SEARCH, Tata Trusts, National Institute of Research and Tribal Health (NIRTH) and the Government of Maharashtra.

Abhay Bang is chairing a 13-member expert committee set up by Union Health Ministry and the Ministry of Tribal Affairs, tasked with coming out with a nationwide status report on tribal health issues along with suggesting possible policy formulations. While the "old" problems of malaria, malnutrition and mortality persist, Abhay Bang emphasises "new" health issues among tribals partly due to outside socio-cultural influences and steady inroads by market forces. Tribal women now list alcohol addiction among men as their biggest concern. The same goes with tobacco, with over 60 per cent of adults in Gadchiroli consuming it daily. These, alongside addition of salt in their foods and stress, are contributing to increased incidence of hypertension, according to Bang. The problems of language barrier and lack of motivation among healthcare staff, besides vacancies and absenteeism when it comes to working in tribal areas, has rendered the formal public healthcare system virtually dysfunctional.

NIRMAN 
In 2006, they started an initiative, NIRMAN, for identifying and nurturing young social change-makers in Maharashtra. It is an educational process to train the youth to take up crucial issues and problems in the society. NIRMAN provides guidance, expertise and environment to inculcate self learning and encourages youth for social action. NIRMAN includes a series of 3 camps, each separated by 6 months. So a batch of NIRMAN goes through 3 camps in a period of 1 year. A camp generally runs for 7–10 days at SEARCH, Gadchiroli. NIRMAN is a learning process based on Nai Talim way of education introduced by Mahatma Gandhi. It believes in problem based learning instead of classroom based learning. NIRMAN initiative is providing a common platform for youth to engage, self-educate and decide on how they can make a difference to the society.

Started in 2006, NIRMAN brings together a group of youth aged between 18 and 28 years who are looking to give meaning to their lives. Amrut, Abhay and Rani Bang's younger son actively manages NIRMAN.

Abhay thinks that it is important to make present generation of doctors think about social challenges. "All doctors can earn enough to make a decent living and they must think about the purpose of their lives. Change would happen the moment they start contemplating." He believes that medical students should regularly be given rural or tribal stints as part of their curriculum so that they are exposed to the real challenges. He thinks that it is equally important to reward doctors who shun the charm of corporate world to serve the real people in need.

Non-communicable diseases 
Abhay and Rani Bang and their team at SEARCH work on non-communicable diseases as those are emerging as a priority area. A study conducted by SEARCH in 86 villages of Gadchiroli district has shown that rural people fall prey to lifestyle diseases like stroke which emerged as the most frequent cause of death. One in seven (14%) deaths in these villages occurs due to stroke, showing that the places like Gadchiroli are now passing through an 'epidemiological transition'. 87.3% stroke deaths occurred at home, indicating that rural people don't approach hospitals for treatment. Taking the study ahead, the SEARCH team now plans to test village based solutions to minimize deaths caused due to stroke in Gadchiroli villages in collaboration with the Wellcome Trust of UK and the department of biotechnology of the government of India.
Yogeshwar Kalkonde, Neurologist and Senior Research Officer at SEARCH is the main author of the study. The team also included three young MBBS doctors from Nirman. The study was published in July 2015 in Stroke, an international journal published by American Stroke and Heart Association and was presented at 5th International Conference on Neurology and Epidemiology (18–20 November 2015) in Australia.

In a study published in Economic and Political Weekly, Bang and SEARCH team members showed that the rural and tribal district of Gadchiroli was spending approximately  crore annually on consuming tobacco and related products. More than 50% of the population was consuming tobacco. SEARCH has been conducting programs to spread awareness regarding the ill effects of tobacco use and providing de-addiction services. The Maharashtra state government has formed a 12-member task force under chief minister Devendra Fadnavis for creating awareness about ill effects of using tobacco products and Abhay Bang is an advisor in the force. It will concentrate on Gadchiroli district for the first three years. A committee has also been constituted under the Gadchiroli District Collector for implementing the plans devised by the task force. A representative of Bang's organization SEARCH will be a member of the committee. According to Bang, spread of information and awareness for prevention, initiation of village committees and urban ward committees, implementation of laws and regulations, treatment for deaddiction, counselling via NGOs and stimulation of an alcohol and tobacco free environment in government offices, schools, colleges, markets etc. will be the methods used by the task force.

Surgical care
The couple, through their organisation SEARCH, built the Maa Danteshwari Hospital for the rural and tribal people of Gadchiroli. Along with OPD and IPD care, a variety of surgeries are also conducted in this setup. Doctors from throughout the state of Maharashtra come and operate in this setup. Shekhar Bhojraj, a spine surgeon from Mumbai, and his team of 6–8 other spine surgeons have been associated with SEARCH for 10 years and have conducted more than 100 spine surgeries in Gadchiroli. In August 2016, when Rani Bang was to undergo spinal surgery herself, she too was operated in the SEARCH hospital by Shekhar Bhojraj and his wife Shilpa, an anaesthetist in Mumbai.

Positions held 
Apart from being the founder directors of SEARCH, Abhay and Rani Bang have served on various national and state level committees. Some of them are as follows:

 Chairman, Expert Group to Plan Health Care for Tribal Populations in India, Ministry of Health and Family Welfare, Govt. of India
 Expert member, Central Health Council, Apex Body of Ministry of Health and Family Welfare, Government of India
 Member, National Rural Health Mission Steering Group, Govt. of India
 Member, High Level Expert Group on Universal Health Care, Planning Commission, Govt. of India
 Member, National Commission on Macro-economics and Health, Govt. of India
 Member, Kelkar Committee on 'Regional Imbalance and Balanced Regional Development', Govt. of Maharashtra
 Member, Audit Advisory Board, Comptroller and Auditor General, Govt. of India
 Chairman, Child Mortality Evaluation Committee, Govt. of Maharashtra
 Member, National ASHA Mentoring Group, Ministry of Health and Family Welfare, Govt. of India
 Member, High Level Committee on Status of Tribal Communities, Govt. of India
 Member, National Commission on Population, Govt. of India
 Member, Steering Committee, Tropical Disease Research, World Health Organization, Geneva
 Member, Advisory Board, Saving Newborn Lives Initiative, Save the Children, US
 Member, Committee on 'Improving Birth Outcome in Developing Countries' constituted by the Global Board on Health, National Academy of Sciences, US
 Member, Scientist Advisory Board, Indian Council of Medical Research, New Delhi
 Member, National Expert Group on Health for planning the 10th National Five Year Plan, Govt. of India
 Member, Governing Board, National Population Stabilization Fund, India
 Member, Planning Commission's Task Force on Panchyat Raj in Health
 Member, WHO Review Committee on Anti-fertility Vaccines
 Member, WHO Review Committee on Measuring Reproductive Morbidity
 Member, Governing Body of IIHMR(Indian Institute of Health Management and Research)
 Member, Institute of Medicine U.S. Committee on Improving Pregnancy Outcome in Underdeveloped Countries (2000 - 2001)

Works

Books

In Marathi 
माझा साक्षात्कारी हृदयरोग Majha Sakshtakari Hrudayrog – Abhay Bang

(In this book Abhay Bang has written about his experiences during his heart disease and the learning he has gained due to it. The book won the Kelkar Award for the Best Literary Book in Marathi, 2000.)

गोईण (Goin) – Rani Bang

(This book won the Literary Award of the Government of Maharashtra. Goin means Friend in the Gondi language of tribal people. The book describes the relationship of tribal women with various trees in Gadchiroli district.)

कानोसा (Kanosa) – Rani Bang

(This book is about the perceptions of rural women regarding various issues of reproductive health.)

In English 
Putting Women First: Women and Health in a Rural Community – Rani Bang (published in 2010.)

In Tamil 
 என் மாயாஜாலப் பள்ளி (தன்னறம் வெளியீடு) - Tamil translation of My Magic school

Essays and letters 

 Meeting the Mahatma by Abhay Bang, published in English Kumarbharti Textbook of Class 9 of Maharashtra State Board of Secondary and Higher Secondary Education
 My Magical School by Abhay Bang, which was translated in English by Arvind Gupta
 Sevagram to Shodhgram by Abhay Bang, which was also translated in English by Arvind Gupta
 A Postcard from Dr Abhay Bang: Vidarbha, Marathwada deserve your maximum attention, CM Fadnavis, an open letter to the Chief Minister of Maharashtra, Devendra Fadnavis, urging him to act on balanced development of Vidarbha and Marathwada regions of Maharashtra and to take steps to reduce liquor consumption in the state

Awards and honours
Abhay and Rani Bang and their organization SEARCH have collectively received the following awards and honours, in chronological order:

1980s 
 Ashoka Fellowship, 1985

1990s 
 Mahatma Gandhi Award for Humanitarian Service, 1994
 Sheshadri Gold Medal, Indian Council of Medical Research (for outstanding research in community medicine), 1996

2000s 
 The Kelkar Award (for the best literary book in Marathi), 2000
 Vivekanand Manava Sewa Award, 2002
 Satpal Mittal Award for Population, Indian Association of Parliamentarians, New Delhi, 2002
 Ramshastri Prabhune Puraskar for Social Justice, Satara, 2002
 Maharashtra Bhushan Award (the highest state honour of the Government of Maharashtra), 2003
 The Global Health Heroes (from Time magazine), 2005
 Stree Shakti Puraskar, Ministry of Women & Child Development, Government of India, 2005
 Navratna Puraskar, Doordarshan Sahyadri Channel, Mumbai, 2005
 MacArthur Foundation International Award, 2006
 Jamnalal Bajaj Award, 2006
 National Award for Women's Development through application of Science & Technology, Government of India, 2007
 Bapu Award, Gandhi National Memorial Society, Pune, 2009

2010s 
 Society of Scholars, Johns Hopkins University, US, 2013
 First Distinguished Alumni Award, Department of International Health at the Johns Hopkins University Bloomberg School of Public Health, 2013
 Social Impact Award, Times of India, 2015
 Dr Wankar Memorial Lifetime Achievement Award, Indian Medical Association, 2015
 Public Health Champions Award for Outstanding Contribution to Public Health in India, WHO India, 2016
 Padma Shri (the fourth highest civilian award in the Republic of India), 2018
 Iconic Changemaker Award, The Hindu, 2018

2021 
 J.R.D. Tata Award for Excellence in Public Service, 2020

References

External links 

SEARCH website
 NIRMAN website
 Bio data on the website of planning commission, a government website
 Dr. Abhay Bang: Research with the People, a 2010 article by Abhay Bang in Forbes India
 Meeting the Mahatma, an essay by Abhay Bang
 My Magical School, another essay by Abhay Bang
 Sevagram to Shodgram, a speech by Abhay Bang
 A Postcard from Dr Abhay Bang: Vidarbha, Marathwada deserve your maximum attention, CM Fadnavis, a 2016 open letter from Abhay Bang to the Chief Minister of Maharashtra

Married couples
Recipients of the Maharashtra Bhushan Award
Living people
Indian health activists
20th-century Indian medical doctors
MacArthur Fellows
Medical doctors from Maharashtra
Social workers
Women scientists from Maharashtra
Social workers from Maharashtra
Indian women medical doctors
20th-century Indian educational theorists
20th-century Indian women scientists
Recipients of the Padma Shri in medicine
Women educators from Maharashtra
Educators from Maharashtra
Scientists from Nagpur
20th-century women physicians
20th-century women educators
Year of birth missing (living people)